This page compares the properties of several typical utility functions of divisible goods. These functions are commonly used as examples in consumer theory.

The functions are ordinal utility functions, which means that their properties are invariant under positive monotone transformation. For example, the Cobb–Douglas function could also be written as: . Such functions only become interesting when there are two or more goods (with a single good, all monotonically increasing functions are ordinally equivalent).

References 
  chapter 5.

Acknowledgements 
This page has been greatly improved thanks to comments and answers in Economics StackExchange.

See also 
 Utility functions on indivisible goods

Utility function types